Pazza idea (Italian for Crazy Idea) is a studio album by Italian singer Patty Pravo, released in 1973 by RCA Italiana.

The material was written by Marco Luberti, Riccardo Cocciante, and Paolo Dossena, among others, and produced by Dossena. The album included the popular no. 1 single "Pazza idea" as well as the Italian cover of Lou Reed's "Walk on the Wild Side", titled "I giardini di Kensington". The LP turned out a commercial success, reaching no. 1 in Italy, and reportedly is Pravo's best-selling album to date. A Spanish-language version of the album, titled Una Locura, was released in Spain.

Track listing
Source:

Side A
"Pazza idea" – 4:43
"Morire tra le viole" – 3:42
"Poesia" – 3:14
"Per gioco per amore" – 2:41

Side B
"Sono cosa tua" – 4:11
"Per simpatia" – 3:14
"I giardini di Kensington" – 3:43
"Limpidi pensieri" – 3:27

Charts

Weekly charts

Year-end charts

References

1973 albums
Italian-language albums
Patty Pravo albums